Justice Carey may refer to:

James B. Carey (judge) (1905–1979), associate justice of the Delaware Supreme Court
Joseph M. Carey (1845–1924), associate justice of the Supreme Court of the Territory of Wyoming
Richard Carey (judge) (died 1789), associate justice of the Virginia Court of Appeals